Natalia Siwiec (born 1 August 1983) is a Polish glamour model. She became widely known after she attended the 2012 UEFA European Football Championship in Warsaw and drew the attention of photographers there. She was subsequently labelled the ‘sexiest’ Polish football fan and ‘Miss Euro 2012’. As a result of this rise to fame she has been dubbed the ‘Polish Larissa Riquelme’. According to Google's annual Zeitgeist Report, Siwiec is one of the most sought after celebrities in Poland.

Personal life 
Siwiec married Mariusz Raduszewski in 2012. On 21 August 2017 she gave birth to their daughter Mia.

References

External links

  
 

Glamour models
Living people
People from Wałbrzych
1983 births